In the Ottoman administrative-military classification of land, a hâss was an estate with revenue. It was further divided into classes.

hass-ı hümayun, Imperial demesne (domain)
hass-ı mir-liva, taxes for district commander
hass-ı mirmiran, prebend of second-level pasha governing a province

References

Taxation in the Ottoman Empire
Land taxation